Xavier Charter School is a public charter school in Twin Falls, Idaho.

History
Xavier Charter School opened in 2007 offering kindergarten through eighth grade classes. A ninth grade class was added for the 2008–09 school year, and an eleventh grade was added for the 2009– 10 school year. and an additional grade will be added each year with the first high school class graduating in 2011. The school currently has grades K–12.

References

Educational institutions established in 2007
Public elementary schools in Idaho
Middle schools in Idaho
Charter schools in Idaho
Schools in Twin Falls County, Idaho
2007 establishments in Idaho